The 1999 Barcelona Dragons season was the seventh season for the franchise in the NFL Europe League (NFLEL). The team was led by head coach Jack Bicknell in his seventh year, and played its home games at Estadi Olímpic de Montjuïc in Barcelona, Catalonia, Spain. They finished the regular season in first place with a record of seven wins and three losses. In World Bowl '99, Barcelona lost to the Frankfurt Galaxy 38–24.

Personnel

Staff

Roster

Schedule

Standings

Game summaries

Week 1: vs Amsterdam Admirals

Week 7: at Amsterdam Admirals

Notes

References

Barcelona Dragons seasons